The 2019–20 Cypriot First Division was the 81st season of the Cypriot top-level football league.

On 15 May 2020, the rest of the season was cancelled due to the COVID-19 pandemic. The title was withheld, and no teams were relegated, with the league expanded to 14 teams next season for a transitional year.

Teams

Promotion and relegation (pre-season)
Alki Oroklini and Ermis Aradippou were relegated at the end of the first-phase of the 2018–19 season after finishing in the bottom two places of the table.

The relegated teams were replaced by 2018–19 Second Division champions Ethnikos Achna and runners-up Olympiakos Nicosia.

Stadiums and locations

Note: Table lists clubs in alphabetical order.

Personnel and kits 
Note: Flags indicate national team as has been defined under FIFA eligibility rules. Players and Managers may hold more than one non-FIFA nationality.

Regular season

League table

Results

Positions by Round
The table lists the positions of teams after each week of matches. In order to preserve chronological progress, any postponed matches are not included in the round at which they were originally scheduled, but added to the full round they were played immediately afterwards. For example, if a match is scheduled for matchday 13, but then postponed and played between days 16 and 17, it will be added to the standings for day 16.

Championship round

Championship round table

Results

Positions by Round
The table lists the positions of teams after each week of matches.

Relegation round

Relegation round table

Results

Positions by Round
The table lists the positions of teams after each week of matches.

Season statistics

Top scorers

References

External links

Cypriot First Division seasons
Cyprus
2019–20 in Cypriot football
Cypriot First Division